Song Shi may refer to:

History of Song (book), a 14th-century Chinese history book on the Song dynasty
Song poetry, Classical Chinese poetry from the Song dynasty
Song Shi (skier) (born 1958), Chinese cross-country skier

See also
History of the Song dynasty (960–1276)